Television broadcasting in Australia began officially on 16 September 1956, with the opening of TCN-9, quickly followed by national and commercial stations in Sydney and Melbourne, all these being in 625-line black and white. The commencement date was designed so as to provide coverage of the Olympic Games in Melbourne. It has now grown to be a nationwide system that includes a broad range of public, commercial, community, subscription, narrowcast, and amateur stations.

Colour television in the PAL 625-line format was introduced in 1967 and went to a full-time basis on 1 March 1975 while subscription television, on the Galaxy platform, began in January 1995. Digital terrestrial television was introduced on 1 January 2001 in Australia's five largest capital cities.

As early as 1929, two Melbourne commercial radio stations, 3UZ and 3DB were conducting experimental mechanical television broadcasts – these were conducted in the early hours of the morning, after the stations had officially closed down. In 1934, Dr Val McDowall at amateur station 4CM Brisbane conducted experiments in electronic television.

Public television
Australia has three national public broadcasters, the Australian Broadcasting Corporation, the Special Broadcasting Service, and, as more recently, National Indigenous Television.

Australian Broadcasting Corporation
ABC Television is a division of the Australian Broadcasting Corporation, established in 1956. ABC TV, ABC TV Plus, ABC Me and ABC News are available nationally, in addition to ABC Australia (Southeast Asian TV channel), focused at the Asia-Pacific region.

ABC TV carries a variety of local and national news, current affairs, and sports coverage, as well as Australian arts and comedy programming. It is well known for broadcasting British programming, primarily from the BBC, ITV, and Channel 4.

ABC TV Plus, established as a second digital-only channel called ABC2 on 7 March 2005. Originally aimed at providing 'more choice, more often', the channel mainly provided repeats of popular ABC productions, such as Australian Story and Stateline, and was prohibited by law from carrying programmes from a number of genres; however, after the removal of these restrictions the channel's content was broadened considerably. It was announced by the ABC that, from 4 December 2017, ABC2 was to be replaced by ABC Comedy, ending the channel's 12-year run.

ABC Me, a third digital-only kids channel began on 4 December 2009.

ABC News, a digital news channel began on 22 July 2010.

ABC Kids, a digital shared channel began on 2 May 2011.

Special Broadcasting Service

SBS Television is a division of the Special Broadcasting Service, founded to provide for the estimated 20% of Australians that speak a language other than English in the home, aiming to complement the ABC.

In recent years SBS TV has begun to target a broader cross-section of the Australian community, in part because of the emergence of specialty subscription television channels aimed at such minorities. In addition to its free-to-air channels, SBS also has an interest in the World Movies Channel which has since been revived on free-to-air TV as SBS World Movies and it relaunched on the 1st of July 2019.

SBS shows many non-English language films with English subtitles, and each morning shows news bulletins in foreign languages from around the world in its WorldWatch timeslot. In addition to this, a great deal of programming from the PBS, Arte, BBC and CBC, and even Comedy Central are shown.

Acquired entertainment programs include the US animated series South Park, Queer as Folk and Inspector Rex. In addition to news and current affairs programming such as SBS World News and Dateline, the network also commissions locally produced documentaries, movies and comedy programs. Less-popular mainstream sports such as soccer, cycling and athletics are also shown.

SBS currently broadcasts six channels: SBS, known as 'SBS One' between 2009 and 2015, SBS Viceland, known as SBS Two between 2009 and 2016, SBS World Movies, SBS Food, known as Food Network Australia between 2015 and 2018, NITV, also known as National indigenous Television (see #National Indigenous Television and more info about this channel in that section), and SBS WorldWatch launched on the 23rd of May of 2022.

National Indigenous Television
National Indigenous Television, funded by the Commonwealth of Australia, is produced in Sydney and broadcast via Imparja Television's existing satellite capacity.

The idea for a national, indigenous television service was initially conceived by the National Indigenous Radio Service (the peak Indigenous radio group), which initially lobbied the government to start a new, nationwide indigenous television network. Although no major political party championed this cause, commercial broadcaster Imparja Television stated in 2004 that it would run such a network, at least within its own licence area. In 2005 the federal Department of Communications, Information Technology and the Arts considered funding such a station, and conducted a review process.

On 13 July 2007 NITV launched, replacing Indigenous Community Television on the Optus Aurora remote satellite service.

On 12 December 2012 NITV was launched on free to air on which was the 4th digital channel of SBS, making this channel available to all Australians wherever SBS digital television is broadcast.

Commercial television

In order to allow for commercial licensing, the country was divided into a number of licence areas. When these were drawn up in the 1950s, each major city or regional area – about 50 in all – was considered its own market region. In each of the five major capitals, three commercial licences were granted (the exception being Perth which did not receive its third commercial station until 1988), while smaller cities or regions were granted a single licence.

The process of aggregation began in 1989. Regional markets were merged and (usually) three licences were granted in the new, aggregated, area, with the exception of Tasmania and Remote & Central Australia, which got two licences. As some markets were formed by the merger of up to six different individual markets, this meant that some stations had to merge or form partnerships in order to remain competitive. Around the same time, many remote market regions were replaced with two satellite market regions – one for regional Western Australia, and one for remote central and eastern Australia – although each of these regions was only granted two licences.

Some remained un-aggregated, and are today known as diary markets. These were granted a second licence, sometimes to the same company that owned the existing licence.  Two-broadcaster areas were later granted a third licence, to a joint venture company formed as a partnership of the two existing broadcasters. Examples of these include Tasmanian Digital Television, Mildura Digital Television, Darwin Digital Television and West Digital Television service.
Areas with one broadcaster were also granted a third licence to the same company that owned the other two licences.

Metropolitan
There are three main metropolitan networks, the Seven Network, Nine Network and Network 10. Although primarily targeted at metropolitan areas, these names are also used in some regional areas (others choose to run the same programming as these stations, but use independent names).

Seven Network
 Headquarters (Administration): Eveleigh, Sydney
National play-out centre: Frenchs Forest, Sydney
 Main Studio
 Breakfast/ Morning Show/ News (National Bulletins): Martin Place, Sydney
 Others Production: Australian Technology Park, Sydney and Docklands Studios Melbourne

Nine Network
 Headquarters: North Sydney
National play-out centre: Frenchs Forest, Sydney
 Main Studio
 Breakfast/ Morning Show/ News (National Bulletins): North Sydney
 Others Production: Docklands Studios Melbourne

Network 10
 Headquarters & National play-out centre: Pyrmont, Sydney
 Main Studio
 Morning Show/ News (National Bulletins): Pyrmont, Sydney

Although the names of the metropolitan stations remain the same across cities, their ownership varies (see below).

Regional and remote

The population of Australians living outside of metropolitan areas are served by a number of regional television networks that are affiliated with a metropolitan counterpart. Before the 1980s, regional stations were mostly independent with some forming loose partnerships and others merging into local networks. However, the Hawke Labor government introduced a system known as aggregation – regional television equalisation – which would provide viewers with the same viewing choices as those in the metropolitan cities. Consequently, the regional stations and networks continued to merge and expand, and became affiliated with one of the three metropolitan networks. Further equalisation later occurred in the 2000s – with the advent of digital television – to areas that escaped initial aggregation.

Today, WIN Television, Imparja Television and Southern Cross Austereo notably remain independent, whereas broadcasters like Prime Television, the Golden West Network, Sunshine Television and NBN Television have been absorbed by the metropolitan networks over the years.

As with some of the metropolitan stations, local content is present only in the form of local news bulletin or local advertising. The amount of local news provided varies from two-minute updates to full-hour, seven nights a week news bulletins.

Current ownership
Commercial stations in metropolitan markets (Sydney, Melbourne, Brisbane, Adelaide, Perth), in addition to some regional markets, are owned and operated by their respective network instead of an affiliate operator. However, commercial stations in most regional and remote areas are instead operated by broadcasters with unique licences and commercial agreements with the metropolitan market networks.

Some regional markets have one operator holding a monopoly over all three networks, with one "digital only" supplementary station of the three operating under a supplementary licence.

Other regional markets have only two operators, each affiliated with their own networks. Consequently, these two operators have formed a supplementary "digital only" joint venture to broadcast the remaining third network.

Notes

Community broadcasting
In 1993 the Australian Broadcasting Authority allocated licences for a sixth television channel for non-profit community and educational use on a trial basis. The groundwork for community television was laid in the Broadcasting Services Act 1992, which defined a new service category, community television, for the first time.

Prospective community television providers were invited to apply for transmitter licences, which were
granted to groups in Sydney, Melbourne, Brisbane, Adelaide and Lismore. In February, 1995, the West Australian Community Broadcasting Association was appointed to manage access to the sixth channel in Perth and Mandurah on behalf of groups based in the two cities.

Licences were also granted in 1996 to Hobart Access Community Television Inc in Hobart and Bendigo Community Television Inc in Bendigo however these were not renewed. Similarly, a licence for BushVision in Mount Gambier was granted in 2005, but it later lapsed. Permanent licences for Sydney, Melbourne, Brisbane and Perth were allocated in 2004, while trial licences remain in effect in Adelaide and Lismore.

The Australian Community Television Alliance, established in March 2008 is the national representative organisation for community television.  The CEO of TVS Sydney, Laurie Patton, is the Secretary and represents ACTA on the Federal Government's Digital Switchover Taskforce Industry Advisory Group. In addition to these, a number of community groups produce programming in regional areas, including Queanbeyan Canberra Television (QCTV) in Canberra, Hunter Community Television in Newcastle, Illawarra Community Television (ICTV) in Wollongong and WARP Television in Bathurst.

Groups in a number of areas including Ballarat and Victor Harbor have unsuccessfully applied for licences. Aurora Community Television, Australian Multicultural Television, Ballarat Community Cable Television, Channel Vision (Canberra) and Satellite Community TV, although not licensed as community stations, provide similar services.

Community Television stations went digital in 2010. However, in September 2014 Australian federal communications minister Malcolm Turnbull announced that licensing for community television stations would end in December 2015. In September 2015, Turnbull, now Prime Minister, announced an extension of the deadline to 31 December 2016. The deadline was further extended incrementally by communications minister Mitch Fifield until June 2021, however by 2015 Sydney's Television Sydney had ceased broadcasting, as had Brisbane's 31 Digital, switching to a short-live online streaming service. As of January 2021, the only remaining community television stations in Australia still broadcasting are Melbourne's C31 and Adelaide's Channel 44.

Subscription television

Two of the three major providers of subscription television in Australia carry a common service; however they have a number of differences. Foxtel currently 'controls' the common service that Optus resell. This service is known as the Foxtel Platform.

Austar broadcast into all of regional Australia (except Western Australia), Tasmania and Darwin while Foxtel broadcast in all capital cities, the Gold Coast, the Central Coast and all of Western Australia until mid-2012 when Foxtel/Austar merged hence Foxtel gaining the Austar coverage areas. Optus Television operates only in the small parts of Sydney, Melbourne, Brisbane and Adelaide where it has laid cable.

SelecTV was the fourth provider of subscription television controlled by WIN Corporation. SelecTV was available throughout Australia via satellite and focused on providing content in comparatively low priced packages to a number of specialised market segments; including Spanish, Greek, and Italian. As of January 2011, the service is no longer available.

There are two small region-based subscription television providers; TransTV Digital which is available in Canberra; and Neighbourhood Cable based in Ballarat, and also available in Geelong & Mildura.

There are also a number of satellite services that target specific language speaking groups, the largest being UBI World TV, a non-English language service. Globecast TV and Pan Global TV are non-English language, Christian and sport channel platforms that are controlled by Globecast. Various operators run their own subscription services on these platforms. In addition, there are other satellite subscription services available through other providers.

National IPTV operators include TPG IPTV.

Datacasting
Datacasting in Australia began as a test transmission in Sydney using one of the reserved digital spectrum positions. Australian broadcast infrastructure company Broadcast Australia undertook the three-year trial using the DVB-T system. The trial consisted of a number of services on one standard 7 MHz multiplex, collectively known as Digital Forty Four. The service was extended past the three-year period, but ended in March 2010

The services included; a combined program guide for the free-to-air broadcasters, named Channel 4; a news, sport, and weather datacast channel provided by the Australian Broadcasting Corporation; a government and public information channel, known as Channel NSW, which included real time traffic information and surf webcams; the Australian Christian Channel; the Expo Channel; and various federal parliamentary audio broadcasts.

Today, datacasting consists of information based channels that are broadcast as subchannels of the existing commercial broadcasters.  As of mid 2013, these broadcast mainly infomercials.  Examples include TVSN and 4ME.

Narrowcasting
There are currently five open-narrowcast services in Australia:

 Aboriginal TV & TVNT – Darwin – link
 Goolarri Television (GTV) – Broome – link
 Indigenous Community Television (ICTV) – Alice Springs
 Ngarda Community Television and Radio – Roebourne, Western Australia
 Snowy Mountains Television (SMTV) – Jindabyne, New South Wales

One of the narrowcast services, Indigenous Community Television (ICTV), is available to satellite users across Australia via the VAST service. 

Aboriginal Television, GTV and Ngarda TV are local Indigenous-owned services that broadcast only to their home market. SMTV is also restricted to its home market of Jindabyne.

Amateur broadcasting
The Australian amateur radio bands include frequencies standard televisions can receive, which have led to amateur radio operators making use of this by broadcasting video.

The frequency overlap occurs roughly where television channel 16 lies. Typically, channel 16 is used for amateur television transmissions; however, other frequencies are sometimes utilized, especially those used by satellite television services. Most transmissions can be viewed and heard on an analogue television, but some transmissions require additional or other equipment.

New South Wales
Television Gladesville (VK2TVG) in Sydney conducts three test transmissions per week on Channel 16, including a three-hour live to air program on Wednesday nights.

The Central Coast Amateur Radio Club also has an amateur television repeater (VK2RTG) on Channel 16.

VK2RTS broadcasts from Lawson near Katoomba on Channel 16. Club activity is on Mondays between 8 and 10p.m.
A Voice liaison and control frequency of 147.325 MHz (+600 kHz duplex) is used.

VK2RFM broadcasts from Oakdale near Camden on 1250 MHz FM which can be viewed with an analog satellite receiver.
Club activity is Tuesdays between 8 and 10p.m. The liaison and control frequency is 147.400 MHz simplex.

Both repeaters cover the entire Sydney basin. They are operated by the Sydney Amateur Television Group and may be activated and used at any time from the control channels.

UHF TV Channel 35 was used until July 2001 when the Australian Communications and Media Authority reassigned the channel for digital television.

Victoria (2 Digital ATV Channels) 
VK3RTV is Melbourne's main amateur television station, and is available via Channel 16 at the lower end of the UHF TV Band (below channel 28). The amateur television repeater is located on Mount Dandenong.

There are a small number of amateur television enthusiasts (amateur radio operators with Television transmitting equipment) who transmit to Melbourne and surrounds via VK3RTV.

These include VK3AAZ, VK3AOB, VK3AGJ, VK3BFG, VK3BCU, VK3CH, VK3CRG, VK3FMD, VK3GMZ, VK3IV, VK3JDA, VK3JDG, VK3KBL, VK3KHB, VK3KOS, VK3LA, VK3MN, VK3PB, VK3TMS, VK3TVZ, VK3XOK, VK3XKD and VK3XZA.

VK3RTV is now a 2-channel digital television facility on 446 MHz. The new system features two standard definition digital channels.

Bendigo in Central Victoria also has an Amateur Television Transmitter (VK3RBO) on the 13 cm band. This can be received using surplus microwave dishes and downconverters. The station is known to show episodes of the Amateur Television Program 'Amateurlogic'.

Queensland

Amateur television in Queensland had its beginnings in the late 1970s, after a group of local Ham radio enthusiasts showed interests in setting up their own television repeater, although this would not occur until the 1980s. For several years, broadcasters had to rely on a low-powered repeater located in Brisbane's northern suburbs, but eventually permissions were granted to have a more advanced and more central repeater constructed within the inner-city suburb of Spring Hill.

In 1990, Brisbane's Amateur Television club provided a two-way television system for Lamington National Park during the park's 75th anniversary celebrations. In October that year, amateur television history was made when broadcasters VK4BOB and VK4XRL transmitted video to Sydney's ATV clubs which was relayed by the AUSSAT satellite.

Various transmitters continue to broadcast to this day. Some Queensland ATV transmitters are located in the outer-Brisbane suburbs of Ocean View and Wamuran. In November 2012, the Ocean View site will begin its first digital transmission test.

In 2014, the Spring Hill repeater was demolished.

See also

 Australian Broadcasting Corporation
 History of broadcasting in Australia
 List of people in communications and media in Australia
 List of radio stations in Australia

Notes

References

Television in Australia
History of television in Australia